Pulikkuthi Pandi is a 2021 Indian Tamil-language action drama television film produced, written and directed by M. Muthaiah. The film stars Lakshmi Menon , Vikram Prabhu and Singampuli, with Samuthrakani, R.K. Suresh, Vela Ramamoorthy and Sujatha Sivakumar in supporting roles. The music for the film is composed by N. R. Raghunanthan. It was released as a television premiere directly in Sun TV on 15 January 2021 coinciding with Pongal and Vikram Prabhu's birthday. This film received positive reviews from audience as well as critics, where Lakshmi Menon received particular praise for her performance and role by the audience.

Plot 
Pandi is a rogue, who has close to 20 petty cases registered under his name in a police station. After meeting Pechi, Pandi decides to be a responsible person as he falls head over heels for her. Though he was ready to mend his ways, Pandi locks horns with Sannasi, a ruthless loan shark, after the latter misbehaves with Pechi and her father. Pandi, Pechi and her relatives face the wrath of Sannasi and his sons, where Pandi dies by being beheaded by Sannasi's son. Enraged, Pechi and her relatives kills  Sannasi and his sons.

Cast

Production 
The film was announced in September 2020 and the makers began production in the same month amid COVID-19 pandemic. Sun TV Network produced the film with a limited budget. The filmmakers initially titled the film as Pechi and began the principal photography, but was later changed to Pulikkuthi Pandi. The film project marked the second collaboration between Vikram Prabhu and Lakshmi Menon after Kumki (2012). It also marked the first film project for Menon in four years after her last film Rekka (2016). Most of the portions of the film were predominantly shot in Madurai and Dindigul.

The shooting of the film completed during November 2020 at a time when Government of Tamil Nadu permitted theatres to open for public for the first time post COVID-19. The first look poster of the film was unveiled on 30 December 2020.

Soundtrack 

The film's soundtrack and score was composed by N. R. Raghunanthan. The album features six tracks with lyrics written by Mohan Rajan, Mani Amudhavan and Araikudi Bharathi Ganesan. It was released on 9 January 2021, six days before the film's release.

Release 
The filmmakers initially planned it for Christmas release on 25 December 2020 but was postponed due delays in post-production. The filmmakers again insisted that the film would be released initially in theatres on 1 January 2021 coinciding with the New Year which also taunted to be the first Tamil film release of 2021 but the theatrical release was cancelled in the last minute due to delays in post-production of the film. The film release was later finalised as a direct television premiere via Sun TV on 15 January 2021 as a Pongal release and subsequently the film would be streamed via digital platform Sun NXT. It became the second film to directly premiere via Sun TV after Naanga Romba Busy (2020).

Reception

Critics 
Avinash Ramachandran of Cinema Express rated the film 3 stars out of 5 stars and said, "proverbial climactic twist saves this generic film". The Times of India rated 2.5 out of 5 stars and said, "The action scenes in the latter half (though violent), cinematography and performances lift the film to a good extent till the climax. All the artists pull off their roles with ease – while Lakshmi Menon, Vela Ramamoorthy and RK Suresh stand out." Baradwaj Rangan of Film Companion South wrote "Muthaiah has a good head for plot, but his screenwriting – the way he fleshes out these plot points – is like what you’d find in a TV serial...there’s no flavour in the lines. There’s no life in the performances."

Ratings 

The film which had a direct TV premiere on Sun TV garnered a viewership of 13.284 million impressions and a rating of 17.05 TVR becoming the most watched Tamil television program in that week.

References

External links 

 

2021 action drama films
2021 television films
Action television films
Drama television films
Films directed by M. Muthaiah
Films not released in theaters due to the COVID-19 pandemic
Films shot in Madurai
Indian action drama films
Indian television films
2020s masala films
2020s Tamil-language films
2021 films